Bryan Shelton (born December 22, 1965) is an American college tennis coach and former professional tennis player.  Shelton played collegiately for Georgia Tech from 1985 to 1988, and then played professionally from 1989 to 1997.  He subsequently returned to his alma mater to coach the Georgia Tech Yellow Jackets women's tennis team, which won the NCAA Women's Tennis Championship in 2007.  He is currently the head coach of the Florida Gators men's tennis team of the University of Florida, where he coached the Gators to winning the 2021 NCAA Championship. He is the only head coach to have won a national championship in both men and women's NCAA Division I Tennis.

Early years
Shelton was born in Huntsville, Alabama.  For high school, he attended Randolph School in Huntsville.  He played for the Randolph Raiders boys' tennis team, and won the Alabama high school singles championship as a senior in 1984.

Personal life
He is the father of tennis player Ben Shelton.

College career
Shelton accepted an athletic scholarship to attend the Georgia Institute of Technology in Atlanta, Georgia, where he played for the Georgia Tech Yellow Jackets men's tennis team from 1985 to 1988.  Shelton was the Atlantic Coast Conference (ACC) champion in singles in 1985, and he and teammate Richy Gilbert were the ACC champions in doubles 1986.  He was recognized as an All-ACC selection during each of his four seasons as a Yellow Jacket, and was named an All-American in 1988.  Shelton won the United States Amateur Championships in 1985.  He graduated from Georgia Tech with a Bachelor of Science degree in industrial engineering in 1989, and was inducted into the Georgia Tech Athletics Hall of Fame in 1993.

Professional career
Shelton won two singles titles (Newport, 1991 and 1992) during his professional career. He also reached the mixed doubles final at the 1992 French Open, partnering Lori McNeil. The right-hander reached his highest individual ranking on the ATP Tour on March 23, 1992, when he became number 55 in the world; his highest doubles ranking, 52, occurred on February 28, 1994. He was inducted to the Huntsville-Madison County Athletic Hall of Fame in 2006.

Coaching

Shelton officially retired from the professional tour in 1997, and was named a United States Tennis Association (USTA) National Coach, a position he held from January 1998 until June 1999. Shelton coached MaliVai Washington, a 1996 Wimbledon finalist.

Shelton became head coach of the Georgia Tech Yellow Jackets women's tennis team in July 1999. In his first season as coach at Georgia Tech, his team went to the second round of the NCAA tournament, upsetting the No. 25 Washington Huskies before falling to the No. 9 UCLA Bruins. He was named ACC Coach of the Year in 2002, 2005, and 2007. His 2007 team won the Yellow Jackets' third-straight ACC Championship.  They then won Georgia Tech's first NCAA-recognized team championship on May 22, 2007, by defeating UCLA in the finals of the NCAA Women's Tennis Championship. Prior to his coaching tenure, the Georgia tech women's tennis team had never qualified for the NCAA tournament.  Shelton was named the Intercollegiate Tennis Association (ITA) Coach of the Year in 2007.

On June 8, 2012, the University of Florida announced that Shelton had been hired as the new head coach of the Florida Gators men's tennis team.

Head coaching record

ATP career finals

Singles (2 titles, 1 runner-up)

Doubles  (2 titles, 1 runner-up)

Singles performance timeline

See also 

 Florida Gators
 History of the University of Florida
 Georgia Tech Yellow Jackets
 List of Georgia Institute of Technology athletes
 Roland Thornqvist
 University Athletic Association

References

External links
 
 
  Bryan Shelton – Georgia Tech profile at RamblinWreck.com
 

1965 births
Living people
African-American tennis coaches
African-American male tennis players
American male tennis players
Florida Gators men's tennis coaches
Georgia Tech Yellow Jackets men's tennis players
Georgia Tech Yellow Jackets women's tennis coaches
Sportspeople from Huntsville, Alabama
Tennis people from Alabama
21st-century African-American people
20th-century African-American sportspeople